Walborg Concordia Maria Lagerwall (8 August 1851 – 3 December 1940) was a Swedish cellist. 

She was a student of the Royal College of Music, Stockholm 1872–1874, and toured Scandinavia in 1879–1883. She played the violoncello in the troupe Damtrion ('The Ladies' Trio') 1881–1883 together with Hilma Åberg and Hilma Lindberg, and at the Royal Swedish Opera in 1884–1889.

References 
 http://runeberg.org/spg/21/0069.html
 http://runeberg.org/vemvardet/0109.html

1851 births
1940 deaths
People from Haninge Municipality
19th-century Swedish musicians
Swedish classical cellists
Women classical cellists
19th-century Swedish women musicians